SA's Got Talent (also known as South Africa's Got Talent or shorten to SAGT) was a South African television show that aired on e.tv and part of the Got Talent series. It was presented by Mo Mahlangu, popularly known as Tol Ass Mo. Singers, dancers, comedians, variety acts, and other performers competed against each other for audience support. The winner of each series received R500,000 (R250,000 in Seasons 1 to 5). The first series of the talent show began on 1 October 2009 and was broadcast weekly with a live semi-finals and final on 12 November 2009.

Format
The auditions take place in front of the judges and a live audience at a different city across South Africa. At any time during the audition the judges may show disapproval to the act by pressing a buzzer which lights that lights a red X near them. If all the judges press their buzzers, the act ends immediately. To advance to the second round, auditionees needed to get at least two yes votes or they would be sent home.

After the auditions the judges have to whittle almost 200 successful acts down to just 21. All of the performers are called back to discover if they have progressed to the semi-finals.

The remaining acts perform across a number of live semi-finals, with the two most popular acts from each semi-finals winning a position in the final. Unlike the American version, judges may still end a performance early with three Xs in the finals, as with the American version, the judges cannot buzz an act after the semi-finals. The judges are again asked to express their views on each act's performance.

After all acts have performed, phone lines open for a short time. After the votes have been counted, the act that has polled the highest number of public votes is automatically placed in the final. The judges then choose between the second and third most popular acts, with the winner of that vote also gaining a place in the final. All other acts are then eliminated from the competition.

From Season 6, the golden buzzer was added, which if pressed would send the contestant straight to the semi-finals but it can only be press once so when press the judges can't hit again and if it they don't need to vote yes or no. The first contestant to get the gold buzzer was Henno William when he sang the song 'Let it be' in the 3rd episode of season 6.

Series overview

International versions
 Got Talent
 America's Got Talent
 Britain's Got Talent
 China's Got Talent
 Australia's Got Talent
 India's Got Talent
 Das Supertalent

References

External links
 SA's Got Talent
 TVSA Show Page

Got Talent
South African reality television series
SABC 2 original programming
Television series by Fremantle (company)
2009 South African television series debuts
2000s South African television series
E.tv original programming
South African television series based on British television series